Charles William Shea  (August 24, 1921 – April 7, 1994) was a United States Army officer and a recipient of the United States military's highest decoration—the Medal of Honor–for his actions in World War II.

Biography
Shea joined the Army from his birthplace of New York City in July 1942, and by May 12, 1944 was serving as a second lieutenant in Company F, 350th Infantry Regiment, 88th Infantry Division. On that day, near Mount Damiano, Italy, he single-handedly disabled three German machine gun nests. He was awarded the Medal of Honor eight months later, on January 12, 1945.

After the war, Shea joined the New York National Guard in 1949 and retired with the rank colonel in 1972. He died in Plainview, New York at age 72 and was buried in Long Island National Cemetery, Farmingdale, New York.

Medal of Honor citation
Shea's official Medal of Honor citation reads:
"For conspicuous gallantry and intrepidity at risk of life above and beyond the call of duty, on 12 May 1944, near Mount Damiano, Italy. As 2d Lt. Shea and his company were advancing toward a hill occupied by the enemy, three enemy machine guns suddenly opened fire, inflicting heavy casualties upon the company and halting its advance. 2d Lt. Shea immediately moved forward to eliminate these machine-gun nests in order to enable his company to continue its attack. The deadly hail of machine-gun fire at first pinned him down, but boldly continuing his advance, 2d Lt. Shea crept up to the first nest. Throwing several hand grenades, he forced the four enemy soldiers manning this position to surrender, and disarming them, he sent them to the rear. He then crawled to the second machine-gun position, and after a short firefight forced two more German soldiers to surrender. At this time, the third machine gun fired at him, and while deadly small-arms fire pitted the earth around him, 2d Lt. Shea crawled toward the nest. Suddenly he stood up and rushed the emplacement and with well-directed fire from his rifle, he killed all three of the enemy machine gunners. Second Lt. Shea's display of personal valor was an inspiration to the officers and men of his company."

See also

 List of Medal of Honor recipients
 List of Medal of Honor recipients for World War II

References

 

1921 births
1994 deaths
United States Army personnel of World War II
United States Army Medal of Honor recipients
Military personnel from New York City
United States Army officers
World War II recipients of the Medal of Honor
National Guard (United States) colonels
New York National Guard personnel